Donald Lee Moak (born April 20, 1957) is a government relations and public affairs consultant and one of the founders of The Moak Group, a public affairs, advocacy, and business consulting firm located in Washington, D.C. Before joining Delta Air Lines and working his way up to a B-767 Delta Air Lines captain, Moak served as a Marine Corps pilot, and as president of the Air Line Pilots Association, International (ALPA), the world's largest non-governmental aviation safety organization

Current Positions

The Moak Group (2015– present)
Moak is a co-founder and chief executive officer of The Moak Group, a public affairs, advocacy, and business consulting firm located in Washington, D.C.

Previous Roles

Air Line Pilots Association, International (ALPA) (2011–2014)
Moak became a member of ALPA's pilots union in 1988. In 2011, he began a four-year term at ALPA as chief executive and administrative officer.

While Moak was their president, ALPA worked to advance pilots’ views in the airline industry before government agencies, airlines, and the news media. ALPA also led pilots to ratify 19 new contracts, including the largest airline merger in history between United and Continental during Moak's tenure. During his tenure, Moak also oversaw the unionization of JetBlue pilots and fought the threat of airlines entering the U.S. market while evading labor protections. Moak and the ALPA led the opposition to a proposal to set up a U.S. customs checkpoint in Abu Dhabi, which U.S. pilots viewed as an advantage for foreign-owned airlines. His job responsibilities also included overseeing the association's daily operations and coordinating the meetings and policy agendas of ALPA's governing bodies.

Delta Air Lines (1988–2014)
After his tours of duty, Moak went to work for Delta Air Lines where he flew B-767s. He served three terms as chairman of the Delta Master Executive Council, beginning in 1995.

Moak led Delta's airline pilots through major transformations within the airline, beginning with the airline's declaration of bankruptcy and subsequent Chapter 11 filing in 2005,  fighting off a hostile takeover attempt from US Airways, and continuing in 2008 during their merger with Northwest Airlines.

Advisory Roles
From 2011 to 2015, Moak served on both the AFL-CIO Executive Council and Financial Oversight Committee for the AFL-CIO Transportation Trades Department. He also had a seat on the FAA NextGen Advisory Committee (NAC) from 2011 to 2014, a committee composed of industry decision makers with the aim of advising the administration on key-decisions regarding the improvement and modernization of the United States’ aviation infrastructure, as well as the FAA Institute Management Council (IMC) of the NextGen Institute from 2011 to 2014. 

Moak was a member of the FAA Management Advisory Council (MAC) on management, policy, spending, and regulatory matters. His tenure ended in 2017.

In 2019, Moak served as co-chair of the U.S. DOT's Special Committee to Review the FAA's Aircraft Certification Process and currently serves on the FAA's Drone Advisory Committee (DAC). Moak also serves on the Board of Governors of the United States Postal Service. The USPS Board of Governors, bipartisan by law, includes governors from both parties. Moak was appointed to this position by the president of the United States at the recommendation of Senate Minority Leader Chuck Schumer (D-NY). Moak was confirmed to his seat on the board of governors by the U.S. Senate in the summer of 2020 and was sworn into his role on June 24, 2020. Within this role, Moak has served as a member on the Compensation and Governance Committee as well as the Operations Committee, and as chairman of the Election Mail Committee. 

Presently, Moak sits on the board of the International Aviation Club of Washington, D.C., which he joined in 2017. Moak is also an advisor on the Aeroméxico Unsecured Creditors Committee (UCC), to which he was appointed in 2020.

References

External links

1957 births
Living people
University of West Florida alumni
United States Postal Service people
American aviators